Nicanor Restrepo Giraldo (June 1871 – 19 May 1938) was a Colombian businessman and politician who served as Mayor of Medellín from 1904 to 1908, and later from 1924 to 1925. He also served as Governor of the now-defunct Department of Jericó from 1908 to 1909.

Biography 
Restrepo Giraldo was born in June 1871 in Medellín, Colombia, to parents Lisandro Restrepo Arango and Dolores Giraldo Gómez.

See also 
 List of mayors of Medellín

References 

1871 births
1938 deaths
People from Medellín
Mayors of Medellín
20th-century Colombian businesspeople
19th-century Colombian people
Colombian people of Spanish descent